Satish Chandra Dubey (born 2 May 1975) is an Indian politician and a member of parliament to the 16th Lok Sabha. He won the 2014 Indian general election from Valmiki Nagar constituency being a Bhartiya Janata Party candidate. He was earlier elected to the Bihar Legislative Assembly from Natkatiaganj in 2010. He serves as a Member of the 'Standing Committee on Labour'.

Criminal Charges 

Chargesheet filed against BJP MP Satish Chandra Dubey in murder case.

Patna: A chargesheet was filed against BJP`s MP from Bihar Satish Chandra Dubey and five others in a 15-year-old murder case, police said on Thursday.

The charge sheet was filed before the court of upper district and session judge in Bettiah, the district headquarters of West Champaran.

In July 1999 in Chanpatia, businessman Gaurishankar Arya died after some criminals attacked him with crude bombs.

Arya`s son Vinod, who filed an FIR in connection with the case, told police that two months before the murder, his father got an extortion call. Extortionists had also threatened to kill him if he did not pay the money.

Police have found involvement of Dubey - MP from the Valmiki Nagar Lok Sabha constituency - and five others in the killing.

Mohammad Zakir, government lawyer in the case, said the court issued summons to witnesses in the case.

Dubey is facing a dozen criminal cases, including those of attempt to murder, kidnapping, extortion and others under the Arms Act, according to the affidavit filed by him before the Election Commission.

References

|-

1975 births
Bihar MLAs 2010–2015
India MPs 2014–2019
Bihar MLAs 2005–2010
Living people
People from West Champaran district
Bharatiya Janata Party politicians from Bihar
Lok Sabha members from Bihar
Rajya Sabha members from the Bharatiya Janata Party